Belize is a town and municipality in Cabinda Province in Angola. The municipality covers 1,360 km2, and had a population of 19,561 at the 2014 Census; the latest official estimate (as at mid 2019) is 22,514.

References

Populated places in Cabinda Province
Municipalities of Angola